Igor Obukhov (born 4 April 1969) is a Belarusian cross-country skier. He competed in the men's 10 kilometre classical event at the 1994 Winter Olympics.

References

1969 births
Living people
Belarusian male cross-country skiers
Olympic cross-country skiers of Belarus
Cross-country skiers at the 1994 Winter Olympics
People from Kirov, Kirov Oblast